The 1st Rifle Division was an infantry division of the Soviet Union's Red Army, it is unclear when the division was first established. Some sources indicate 1918, others indicate 1924 or 1927. The division was formed from units already stationed in Moscow as the 1st Moscow Rifle Division. It became a motorized unit in 1940.

First formation
The division was initially placed on "cadre" status, but in 1932 it was upgraded to a "shock" division and tank and motorized elements were added. In August 1939, as the Soviet Union began to mobilize and expand the army, the division was broken up to provide cadres for two new divisions. The 2nd Rifle Regiment was used to form the 115th Rifle Division and the 3rd Rifle Regiment was used to form the 126th Rifle Division. The 1st Rifle Regiment was then used to form new 1st Rifle Division.

Subordinate units
1st Rifle Regiment
2nd Rifle Regiment
3rd Rifle Regiment
1st Artillery Regiment

Second formation
The division was formed from the remaining cadre of the division. The division was assigned as the garrison for the city of Moscow. In December 1939 the division was ordered to convert to a motorized division and in January 1940 was redesignated the 1st Motorized Division. This division eventually became the 1st Guards Motor Rifle Division.

Subordinate Units
6th Rifle Regiment
176th Rifle Regiment
375th Rifle Regiment
13th Artillery Regiment

Third formation
It was reformed for the third time on 13 March 1942 at Kuibyshev (though a second source, probably Poirer and Connor, says June 1942 was also a possibility). After completion of training the division was transferred to the 5th Reserve Army. Assigned to 63rd Army from August to November 1942, and fought at Stalingrad. It became the 58th Guards Rifle Division on 31 December 1942.

Subordinate units
Units were awarded their Guards designation on 27 February 1943
408th Rifle Regiment (I) becomes 173rd Guards Rifle Regiment 
412th Rifle Regiment (I) becomes 175th Guards Rifle Regiment
415th Rifle Regiment (I) becomes 178th Guards Rifle Regiment
1026th Artillery Regiment becomes 130th Guards Artillery Regiment
339th Separate Antitank Artillery Battalion becomes 66th Guards Sep. Anti-Tank Artillery Battalion
1st Reconnaissance Company becomes 61st Guards Reconnaissance Company
55th Sapper Battalion becomes 69th Guards Sapper Battalion
332nd Separate Signals Battalion becomes 87th Guards Separate Signal Battalion
81st Medical Battalion becomes 348th Medical Battalion
24th Decontamination Company becomes 62nd Guards Decontamination Company
525th Auto-Transport Company becomes 349th Auto-Transport Company
369th Field Bakery becomes 238th Field Bakery
745th Veterinary Field Hospital becomes 348th Veterinary Field Hospital
1825th Field Postal Station no change
1148th Field Cash Office of the State Bank no change

Fourth formation
The division was reformed for the fourth time in December 1943, or January 1944, at Nevel in the rear areas of 6th Guards Army. The 31st and 100th Rifle Brigades provided the basis for the new formation. It was transferred to 70th Army, 2nd Belorussian Front, and with that Army took Brest, Belarus, winning the title 'Brest'. It later advanced into Poland, fighting at Gdynia. It became part of the Group of Soviet Forces in Germany briefly, but with the rest of 70th Army and 114th Rifle Corps moved to the South Urals region and was disbanded on 24 July 1945.

However, the division appears to have been disbanded in the summer of 1945 in accordance with Stavka Directive No. 11095, which directed the formation of the Group of Soviet Forces in Germany.

Subordinate units
408th Rifle Regiment (II)
412th Rifle Regiment (II)
415th Rifle Regiment (II)
226th Artillery Regiment
339th Separate Antitank Artillery Battalion
1st Reconnaissance Company
55th Sapper Battalion
30th Separate Signals Battalion (formally the 306th Sep. Signals Company)
81st Medical Battalion (formally the 79th Medical Battalion)
24th Decontamination Company
525th Auto-Transport Company
369th Field Bakery
745th Veterinary Field Hospital
1644th Field Postal Station
1634th Field Cash Office of the State Bank

References

Sources
 Craig Crofoot, Armies of the Bear, Volume I Part 1
 
 Robert Poirer, Albert Conner, Red Army Order of Battle in the Great Patriotic War, Presidio Press, 1985
 Agentstvo Voyennykh Novostey, 5 November 2001

001
001
Military units and formations established in the 1920s
Military units and formations awarded the Order of the Red Banner